Major-General James Walter Sandilands  (1874–1959) was a senior British Army officer who served as Commander of British Troops in South China.

Military career
Sandilands joined the Militia as he was commissioned a second lieutenant in the Manchester Regiment on 14 April 1895. He was later promoted to lieutenant in a militia battalion of the Gordon Highlanders. He transferred to the regular army as he was commissioned for a full-time appointment as second lieutenant in the Queen's Own Cameron Highlanders on 24 March 1897, and fought in the Mahdist War in 1898, for which he was mentioned in despatches and promoted to lieutenant on 28 September 1898.

He served in the Second Boer War with Mounted Infantry. During the war, he was present for operations in the Orange Free State from February to May 1900, then in Transvaal and the Orange River Colony during the rest of 1900. He took part in actions near Johannesburg and Pretoria in May and June 1900, and in the battles of Diamond Hill (June 1900), Wittebergen (July 1900) and Elands River (August 1900). He was wounded on 13 December 1900 during the Battle of Nooitgedacht and evacuated under fire from the battlefield by Sergeant Donald Farmer who was awarded the Victoria Cross for this act of bravery. He continued to serve in South Africa throughout the war, including in Cape Colony, and was promoted to captain on 29 May 1901. For his service in the war, he was twice mentioned in despatches (including in the final despatch by Lord Kitchener dated 23 June 1902), received the Queen's South Africa Medal with four clasps, and the Distinguished Service Order (DSO).

Sandilands also served in World War I as a Deputy Assistant Adjutant and Quartermaster-General. Later he became Military Attaché in Berlin. He also commanded the 104th Brigade, part of the 35th Division.

He was appointed Commander of British Troops in South China in 1929 and retired in 1933.

Further reading
The History of the 7th Battalion Queen's Own Cameron Highlanders by James Walter Sandilands, Richardson Publishing, 2009, 
A Lancashire Brigade in France  by James Walter Sandilands, Business Newspapers Ltd, 1919

References

1874 births
1959 deaths
Companions of the Order of the Bath
Companions of the Order of St Michael and St George
Companions of the Distinguished Service Order
Queen's Own Cameron Highlanders officers
British Army major generals
British Army personnel of the Second Boer War
British Army personnel of the Mahdist War
Manchester Regiment officers
Gordon Highlanders officers
British Army generals of World War I
British military attachés
British expatriates in China